The Cherokee National Capitol, now the Cherokee Nation Courthouse, is a historic tribal government building in Tahlequah, Oklahoma.  Completed in 1869, it served as the capitol building of the Cherokee Nation from 1869 to 1907, when Oklahoma became a state.  It now serves as the site of the tribal supreme court and judicial branch.  It was designated a National Historic Landmark in 1961 for its role in the Nation's history.

History

The Cherokee Nation first established a republican form of government in 1820, while still occupying their ancestral lands in the southeastern United States.  The tribe was one of several forcibly relocated to what is now Oklahoma during the Trail of Tears of the 1830s.  The Nation reestablished its government quickly, in 1838, following the removal, with Tahlequah as its capital.  In addition to establishing its courts and council, the Nation built seminaries for both male and female students, as education was highly valued.

Early government meetings of the Nation were held out in the open, with later meetings in log structures.  A courthouse was built in the 1840s, but most of the city's public buildings were destroyed during the American Civil War.  This building was constructed from 1867-1869, after peace had been restored to the region. The building's style, a late interpretation of the Italianate, is unusual for Oklahoma.  The architect was C. W. Goodlander. Originally it housed the nation's court as well as other offices, and was used for tribal council meetings.  It served the tribal government until 1907, when the state of Oklahoma was established and the tribal government was abolished by an act of the United States Congress.

The capitol was designated a National Historic Landmark in 1961.  The building currently houses the judicial branch of the Cherokee Nation government. In 2013, the nation began a restoration project to preserve the building's original appearance, including roof repairs with historical-era shingles, new decking, new doors and windows, and adding a cupola to the roof. The project also includes adding a new back porch.

Description
The Cherokee Nation Courthouse stands in the center of Courthouse Square, bounded by East Delaware Street, South Water Avenue, East Keetoowah Street, and South Muskogee Avenue.  It is a two-story masonry building with neoclassical Italianate style, built out of red brick and white-painted wooden trim.  It is five bays wide and seven deep, with slightly projecting sections consisting of the center three bays on each side.  Each of these is topped by a pedimented gable with a dentillated cornice.  The wall bays are articulated by piers, and have segmented-arch windows on the ground floor and rounded-arch windows on the second.  There are entrances on the east and west ends, the main entrance on the west side sheltered by a 20th-century brick vestibule.

See also

 List of National Historic Landmarks in Oklahoma
Oldest buildings in Oklahoma
 National Register of Historic Places listings in Cherokee County, Oklahoma

References

External links
 Cherokee Tribal Court web site
 Cherokee National Capitol Building, 101-29 South Muskogee Avenue, Tahlequah, Cherokee, OK at the Historic American Buildings Survey (HABS)

National Historic Landmarks in Oklahoma
Buildings and structures in Tahlequah, Oklahoma
Legislative buildings
Cherokee Nation (1794–1907)
Native American history of Oklahoma
Neoclassical architecture in Oklahoma
Government buildings on the National Register of Historic Places in Oklahoma
Historic American Buildings Survey in Oklahoma
National Register of Historic Places in Cherokee County, Oklahoma
Government buildings completed in 1869
1869 establishments in Indian Territory